Tomahawk Radio was a company which operated two radio stations in Bristol.

Originally, owner of Original 106.5 FM in Bristol, Tomahawk Radio then acquired Bristol's Star 107.2 from UKRD. The company merged operations so that the two stations broadcast from single premises in the city and later rebranded Original as Jack FM.

On 7 September 2010 the group was acquired by Southampton based Celador Radio.

References

External links
 Media UK entry for Tomahawk Radio

Radio broadcasting companies of the United Kingdom
Radio stations in England